Christopher "Chris" White (born 28 November 1971) is an American former professional darts player who has played in the Professional Darts Corporation (PDC) tournaments.

Career
White made his debut on the 2009 Las Vegas Desert Classic, losing to Andy Hamilton 6–1. He then appeared at the 2017 US Darts Masters losing 6–0 to Michael van Gerwen.

White quit the PDC in December 2022.

References

External links

1971 births
Living people
American darts players
Professional Darts Corporation associate players
Sportspeople from Clarington